Washington Township is one of ten townships in Knox County, Indiana. As of the 2010 census, its population was 2,286 and it contained 1,022 housing units.

History
It is named for George Washington.

Enoco Coal Mine was added to the National Register of Historic Places in 2010.

Geography

References

External links
 Indiana Township Association
 United Township Association of Indiana

Townships in Knox County, Indiana
Townships in Indiana